Jocassee Dam (often called Lake Jocassee Dam) is an embankment dam on the Keowee River, straddling the border of Pickens and Oconee counties in South Carolina in the United States. The dam forms Lake Jocassee, which is fed by the Toxaway, Thompson, Horsepasture and Whitewater Rivers, and serves primarily for hydroelectric power generation and flood control. The dam and reservoir are part of the Keowee-Toxaway Hydroelectric Project, owned and operated by Duke Energy.

The dam supports a  hydroelectric station, generating power from four turbines. Two of the turbines were installed in 1973, while the third and fourth units came online in 1975. The dam is shown under construction in the 1972 thriller film Deliverance.

See also

List of largest reservoirs in the United States
List of the tallest dams in the United States

References

Dams completed in 1973
Energy infrastructure completed in 1973
Energy infrastructure completed in 1975
Dams in South Carolina
Embankment dams
Buildings and structures in Oconee County, South Carolina
Buildings and structures in Pickens County, South Carolina
Pumped-storage hydroelectric power stations in the United States
Hydroelectric power plants in South Carolina